Asif Mehmood is a Pakistani politician who was a Member of the Provincial Assembly of the Punjab, from May 2013 to May 2018.

Early life and education
He was born on 14 August 1978 in Rawalpindi.

He graduated in 2011 from University of the Punjab and has a degree of Bachelor of Arts.

Political career
He was elected to the Provincial Assembly of the Punjab as a candidate of Pakistan Tehreek-e-Insaf from Constituency PP-9 (Rawalpindi-IX) in 2013 Pakistani general election.

References

Living people
Punjab MPAs 2013–2018
1978 births
Pakistan Tehreek-e-Insaf MPAs (Punjab)